Following is a list of all Article III United States federal judges appointed by President Millard Fillmore during his presidency. In total Fillmore appointed 6 Article III federal judges, including 1 Justice to the Supreme Court of the United States and 5 judges to the United States district courts.

Associate Justice John McKinley's death in July, 1852, led to repeated, fruitless attempts by the president to fill the vacancy. The three unsuccessful nominees included Edward A. Bradford, nominated August 16, 1852, George Edmund Badger, nominated January 3, 1853 and William C. Micou, nominated February 14, 1853. The United States Senate took no action on any of the nominees.

Fillmore shared the appointment of Henry Boyce with Zachary Taylor. Taylor recess appointed Boyce and later nominated him. However, the United States Senate did not confirm Boyce until after Taylor's death and Boyce received his commission from Fillmore.

United States Supreme Court justices

District courts

Notes

References
General

 

Specific

Sources
 Federal Judicial Center

Fillmore

Presidency of Millard Fillmore